Bickler is a surname. Notable people with the surname include:

Dave Bickler (born 1953), American singer
Jacob Bickler (1849–1902), American scholar and educator

See also
Bickle